HE 1327-2326, discovered in 2005 by Anna Frebel and collaborators, was the star with the lowest known iron abundance until SMSS J031300.36−670839.3 was discovered. The star is a member of Population II stars, with a solar-standardised iron to hydrogen index [Fe/H], or metallicity, of −5.4±0.2. The scale being logarithmic, this number indicates that its iron content is about 1/250000 that of the Earth's sun. However, it has a carbon abundance of roughly one-tenth solar ([C/H] = −1.0), and it is not known how these two abundances can have been produced/exist simultaneously. Discovered by the Hamburg/ESO survey for metal-poor stars, it was probably formed during an age of the universe when the metal content was much lower. It has been speculated that this star is part of the second generation, born out of the gas clouds which were imbued with elements such as carbon by the primordial Population III stars.

As of 2018, HE 1327-2326 was the brightest star known with [Fe/H] < -5.   This is important because the spectral lines for metals are weak in such stars, so a bright star is needed to obtain high signal/noise spectra.

The small amount of metals seen in HE 1327-2326 are believed to have been produced by a supernova event in a first generation star. Spherically symmetric models of supernovae fail to reproduce the relative abundances of metals seen in HE 1327-2326, regardless of the mass of the supernova progenitor. Because of this, Ezzeddine et al. argued in 2019 that HE 1327-2326's metal enrichment was due to an aspherical supernova explosion of a 25  Population III star which enriched the interstellar medium via mass loss through bipolar jets.

See also 
Ultra low metallicity / ultra metal poor stars
 Cayrel's Star
 HE 0107-5240
 SDSS J102915+172927
 SMSS J031300.36−670839.3

References

External links 
 
 Hamburg/ESO survey (Christlieb+, 2008)
 https://web.archive.org/web/20101224201249/http://www.space.com/astronotes/astronotes.html
 http://jumk.de/astronomie/special-stars/he1327-2326.shtml

Hydra (constellation)
Population II stars
Astronomical objects discovered in 2005